ZZA may refer to:
The ISO 639-2 language code for the Zaza language
The General Catalogue of Variable Stars code for a type of pulsating white dwarf